The 2000 United States Senate elections were held on November 7, 2000. The elections coincided with other federal and state elections, including the presidential election which was won by Republican George W. Bush. It featured a number of fiercely contested elections that resulted in a victory for the Democratic Party, which gained a net total of four seats from the Republican Party. This election marked the first election year since 1990 where Democrats made net gains in the Senate.

These elections took place six years after Republicans had won a net gain of eight seats in Senate Class 1. Despite George W. Bush's victory in the presidential election, the GOP lost 4 senate seats, the most a winning president's party has lost since the passage of the 17th amendment. Democrats defeated incumbent Republicans in Delaware, Michigan, Minnesota, Missouri, and Washington, and they won an open seat in Florida. In Missouri, the winner was elected posthumously. The Republicans defeated a Democratic incumbent in Virginia, and won an open seat in Nevada.

These elections resulted in an equal 50–50 split between Republicans and Democrats, with the Vice President casting the tie-breaking votes in the Senate. This was the third tied Senate, after the results in the 1880 elections and a brief period in 1953. Democrats thereby held Senate control briefly for only 17 days, since Al Gore was still Vice President and President of the Senate at the beginning of the new term on January 3, 2001. The Republicans regained control of the chamber when the new Vice President Dick Cheney was inaugurated on January 20. However, the Republican majority would only last until June 6, 2001, when Republican Senator Jim Jeffords of Vermont became an independent and caucused with the Democrats.

Until 2020, this was the last time that Democrats would pickup a Senate seat in Georgia, with the result being a 50–50 split with control decided by the Vice President's tie-breaking vote. This is the last election with only Republicans and Democrats in the Senate, and the last election in which Republicans won seats in Rhode Island and Vermont.

Results summary 

Source:

Change in composition

Before the elections 
After the July 27, 2000 appointment in Georgia.

After the elections

Beginning of the first session

Gains and losses

Retirements
One Republican and four Democrats retired instead of seeking re-election.

Defeats
One Democrat and five Republicans sought re-election but lost in the general election.

Race summary

Special elections during the previous Congress 

In this special election, the winner was seated between January 1, 2000, and January 2, 2001.

Elections to the next Congress 

In these general elections, the winners were elected for the term beginning January 3, 2001.

All of the elections involved the Class 1 seats.

Closest races 
In ten races the margin of victory was under 10%

Arizona 

Incumbent Republican Jon Kyl won re-election to a second term, as no candidate was nominated from the Democratic Party. Independent Bill Toel, Green party nominee Vance Hansen, and Libertarian party nominee Barry Hess each got more than 5% of the vote, a strong third party performance.

California 

The heavily financed and popular senator Dianne Feinstein (D) easily won re-election to her second full term defeating the underfunded and underdog candidate Representative Tom Campbell (R) by over 19 points. Campbell even lost his own congressional district by almost 15 points.

Primary election results:

Despite touting his service as a moderate Republican representing a strongly Democratic district, Campbell was underfunded and a decided underdog against the popular, heavily financed Feinstein. By February, he spent barely $1 million without any PAC money. Campbell has generally supported gay rights and abortion. He also opposes the War on Drugs and calls himself a "maverick", similar to U.S. senator John McCain. Campbell was badly defeated, losing by over 19 points.

Connecticut 

Incumbent Democrat Joe Lieberman won re-election to a third term over Republican Philip Giordano, Mayor of Waterbury and former State Representative. While running for re-election, he was also Al Gore's running mate in the 2000 presidential campaign. With Gore losing the presidency to George W. Bush, Lieberman returned to the Senate and remained there for another 13 years, when he retired. Had the Gore–Lieberman ticket won, Lieberman would have become U.S. Vice President and forced to resign his Senate seat, which would have led to a 2002 special election. It would also have led Republican Governor John G. Rowland to temporarily appoint an interim replacement.

Lieberman, a very popular centrist incumbent, focused on his vice presidential campaign. He refused to show up at the debates. Giordano was a heavy underdog, as he was ignored by the press and as he debated alone.

Delaware 

Incumbent Republican William Roth ran for re-election to a sixth term, but was defeated by Governor Tom Carper.

For 16 years the same four people had held the four major statewide positions. Because of term limits on the Governor's position Thomas Carper could not run again. Both he and U.S. Representative Michael Castle wanted to be U.S. senator. Roth would not retire, and fellow Republican Castle decided against a primary.

Roth, 79, was in the U.S. Senate for 30 years. He was the Chairman of the Finance Committee. Carper, 53, was a popular Governor and former U.S. Congressman of Delaware's At-large congressional district, who announced his major candidacy against Roth back in September 1999. Both candidates were moderates. Roth was one of the few Republicans to vote for the Brady Bill. Although Roth started the campaign with a 2-to-1 spending advantage, Carper went into the final month with more than $1 million on hand. In a contest between two popular and respected politicians, the issue seemed to be Roth's age versus Carper's relative youth.

Carper defeated Roth by over ten points. However, Roth received more votes than Presidential candidate George W. Bush, suggesting the strength of the Democratic turnout was a boon to Carper's candidacy and a key element of his victory. Many consider Roth's defeat due to his age and health, as he collapsed twice during the campaign, once in the middle of a television interview and once during a campaign event.

Florida 

Incumbent Republican Connie Mack III decided to retire instead of seeking a third term. Democrat Bill Nelson, State Treasurer and former U.S. Representative, won the open seat over Republican Congressman Bill McCollum.

This election was in conjunction to the presidential election, where Bush narrowly defeated Gore after an intense recount. The senate election was evenly matched with two U.S. Congressmen named Bill in their mid-50s. Both parties heavily targeted this senate seat. The election became very nasty as Nelson called his opponent "an extremist who would sacrifice the elderly, the poor, and the working class to coddle the rich." McCollum called the Democrat "a liberal who would tax everything that moves, and some things that don't." The election advertisements were very negative, as both candidates talked more about each other than themselves.

Nelson raised only soft money, but had help from President Bill Clinton and VP Al Gore. Two days before the election, McCollum predicted he would win by a 6-point margin. On election day, he lost by a 5-point margin.

Georgia (special) 

Incumbent Democrat Zell Miller, who was appointed by Democrat Governor Roy Barnes to replace the late Republican Paul Coverdell, won re-election to serve the remainder of the term, beating Republican Mack Mattingly, former Ambassador to Seychelles and former U.S. senator. Until 2020, when Raphael Warnock won this seat, and Jon Ossoff won the other Senate seat, this is the last Senate election in Georgia won by a Democrat and also until 2020, this is the last time the Democrats have won the Class III Senate seat from Georgia.

One of the biggest campaign issues was Social Security. Miller attacked Mattingly for supporting a raise in the retirement age. The Republican fought back by connecting him to liberal Democrat Ted Kennedy of Massachusetts, and on his vote to block legislation aimed at protecting Social Security. Mattingly said he would vote for Texas Governor George W. Bush for president, who was very popular in the state and led Vice President Al Gore in many Georgia polls. Mattingly then asked Miller who he was supporting in the presidential election. Miller conceded he would vote for Gore because he helped him when he was governor including drought relief, welfare reform, and the Atlanta Olympics. "That does not mean I agree with all of his policies," he concluded. In early October, a poll showed Miller leading with 59% of the vote, despite the fact that Bush was leading Gore by a double-digit margin.

Note: This election was a non-partisan election due to it being a special election. Each candidate ran without a party. The parties below reflect which party label each candidate would have run under if given the option.

Hawaii 

Incumbent Democrat Daniel Akaka won re-election to his second full term, over Republican John Carroll, former State senator and former State Representative.

Indiana 

Incumbent Republican Richard Lugar was re-elected to his fifth six-year term over Democrat David Johnson.

Lugar easily won re-election taking 66.5% one of the largest margins in a statewide race in Indiana history. Johnson only took one county, Lake County, a Democratic stronghold which borders Chicago.

Maine 

Incumbent Republican Olympia Snowe was re-elected to a second term, defeating Democratic candidate Mark Lawrence, former President of the Maine State Senate.

Snowe, a popular moderate incumbent, outpolled and outspent Lawrence. The two candidates agreed to debate on October 15 and 25.

Maryland 

Incumbent Democrat Paul Sarbanes won re-election to a fifth term over Republican Paul Rappaport, former Howard County police chief and nominee for Lieutenant Governor in 1994.

Rappaport won the Republican primary against S. Rob Sobhani, Ross Zimmerman Pierpont, Robin Ficker, Kenneth R. Timmerman, Kenneth Wayman and John Stafford through a grassroots movement with a plurality of just 23%. Rappaport, a major underdog, pushed for three debates. The four term incumbent actually agreed to one debate on October 26.

Massachusetts 

Incumbent Democrat Ted Kennedy won re-election to his eighth (his seventh full) term.  The election was notable for a strong third-party performance from Libertarian Carla Howell, who finished with less than a percent behind Republican Jack E. Robinson.

Michigan 

Incumbent Republican Spencer Abraham ran for re-election to a second term, but was defeated by Democrat Debbie Stabenow.

Abraham, who was first elected in the 1994 Republican Revolution despite never running for public office before, was considered vulnerable by the Democratic Senatorial Campaign Committee. Major issues in the campaign included prescription drugs for the elderly. By September 4, Abraham still had failed to reach 50% in polls despite having spent over $6 million on television ads. In mid-October, he came back and reached 50% and 49% in two polls respectively.

The election was very close with Stabenow prevailing by just over 67,000 votes. Stabenow was also likely helped by the fact that Al Gore won Michigan on the presidential level. Ultimately, Stabenow pulled out huge numbers out of the Democratic stronghold of Wayne County, which covers the Detroit Metropolitan Area. Stabenow also performed well in other heavily populated areas such as Ingham County home to the state's capital of Lansing, and the college town of Ann Arbor. Abraham did not concede right after major news networks declared Stabenow the winner; He held out hope that the few outstanding precincts could push him over the edge. At 4:00AM, Abraham conceded defeat. Senator Abraham called Stabenow and congratulated her on her victory. A historic election, Stabenow became the first woman to represent Michigan in the United States Senate.

Minnesota 

The race pitted incumbent Republican senator Rod Grams against former Minnesota State Auditor Mark Dayton.

Mississippi 

Incumbent Republican Trent Lott won re-election to a third term over perennial Democratic candidate Troy Brown.

Missouri 

Incumbent Republican John Ashcroft lost the election to Governor Mel Carnahan, despite Carnahan's death three weeks before election day.

In 1998, Ashcroft briefly considered running for president. On January 5, 1999, he announced that he would not seek the presidency and would instead defend his Senate seat in the 2000 election. Missouri Governor Mel Carnahan announced he would contest the Senate election as a Democrat.

In the general election for the state's seat in the U.S. Senate, Ashcroft was facing then-Governor Mel Carnahan in a "tight" race, despite the senator having a larger budget than Carnahan, a war chest that included significant contributions from corporations such as Monsanto Company, headquartered in St. Louis, Missouri, which gave five times more to Ashcroft's campaign fund than to the fund of any other congressional hopeful at the time.

Carnahan was killed in a plane crash three weeks before the November election date. Nonetheless, Carnahan's name remained on the ballot due to Missouri's election laws. Lieutenant Governor Roger B. Wilson became Governor upon Carnahan's death, to serve the remaining term of Carnahan's governorship. Ashcroft suspended all campaigning on the day of the plane crash in light of the tragedy and resumed it eight days before the election date.

The voters of Missouri, by a margin of approximately fifty thousand votes, chose for the U.S. Senate Mel Carnahan, their Governor who had died two weeks before the election. No one had ever posthumously won election to the Senate, though voters on at least three other occasions had until then chosen deceased candidates for the House of Representatives: Clement Woodnutt Miller (D) in California in 1962; Nick Begich (D) in Alaska, 1972; and Hale Boggs (D) in Louisiana, 1972. Hence, John Ashcroft became the first U.S. Senate candidate to be defeated by a dead opponent.

Governor Roger B. Wilson appointed Carnahan's 66-year-old widow, Jean Carnahan, to fill her husband's vacant seat until the next cycle of Senate elections when a successor could be elected to serve out the remaining four years of the deceased Carnahan's would-be term. Ashcroft stated that he hoped the appointment would be "a matter of comfort for Mrs. Carnahan."

Montana 

Incumbent Republican Conrad Burns won re-election to a third term.

Though Sam Rankin won the Reform Party's nomination for the United States Senate, he dropped out of the race over the summer and was replaced by Gary Lee.

Conrad, in a poll released September 21, was leading Schweitzer 48% to 39% that went down from 49% in November 1999. Schweitzer had his polls go up by 11 points.

Burns faced a surprisingly difficult re-election campaign in 2000. In February 1999, he announced that he would break his 1988 promise to only hold office for two terms, claiming "Circumstances have changed, and I have rethought my position." Later that same month, while giving a speech about U.S. dependence on foreign oil to the Montana Equipment Dealers Association, he referred to Arabs as "ragheads". Burns soon apologized, saying he "became too emotionally involved" during the speech.

Burns faced Brian Schweitzer, a rancher from Whitefish, Montana. While Burns attempted to link Schweitzer with presidential candidate Al Gore, whom Schweitzer never met, Schweitzer "effectively portrayed himself as nonpolitical". Schweitzer primarily challenged Burns on the issue of prescription drugs, organizing busloads of senior citizens to take trips to Canada and Mexico for cheaper medicine. Burns charged that Schweitzer favored "Canadian-style government controls" and claimed that senior citizens went to doctors to have "somebody to visit with. There's nothing wrong with them." Burns also faced trouble regarding deaths from asbestos in Libby, Montana. While he initially supported a bill to limit compensation in such cases, he withdrew his support for the bill, under public criticism, and added $11.5 million for the town to an appropriations bill.

Burns spent twice as much money as Schweitzer on the election and only defeated him by a slim margin, 51-47 percent, while the state voted 58-33 percent for Republican presidential nominee George W. Bush. Schweitzer went on to become governor in 2004.

Nebraska 

Incumbent Democrat Bob Kerrey decided to retire. Democrat Ben Nelson won the open seat, beating Don Stenberg, the Republican Attorney General of Nebraska.

Nevada 

Incumbent Democrat Richard Bryan decided to retire, instead of seeking a third term. Republican nominee John Ensign won the open seat over Democratic attorney Ed Bernstein.

New Jersey 

Incumbent Democrat Frank Lautenberg decided to retire, rather than seeking a fourth term. The Democratic nominee, former CEO of Goldman Sachs Jon Corzine, defeated the Republican nominee, U.S. Representative Bob Franks, in a close election.

Senator Lautenberg, first elected to the Senate in 1982 in an upset victory over Rep. Millicent Fenwick (R-Bergen), had always been an underdog in all three bids for Senate. He beat Pete Dawkins in 1988 by a 54%-46% margin and held back a challenge from Chuck Haytaian by a smaller margin of 50%-47%. However, popular Governor Christine Todd Whitman was expected to challenge Lautenberg, and opinion polls showed Lautenberg losing by a large margin. He retired but later regretted his decision because Gov. Whitman and Former Governor Tom Kean both declined to run for the Senate. Lautenberg would be elected to the state's other Senate Seat in 2002.

Corzine spent $35 million of his own money into the Democratic primary election alone when running against Jim Florio, who served as the 49th Governor of New Jersey from 1990 to 1994. Governor Florio was unpopular during his tenure in office. Most notably, he signed a $2.8 Billion tax increase in 1990. It caused his party to lose control of the state government for a decade, and cost the Governor his re-election bid in 1993.

Corzine, running as an outsider, was endorsed by State senator Raymond Zane (D-Gloucester), State senator Wayne Bryant (D-Camden), State senator John Adler (D-Camden), U.S Representative Bob Menendez (D-Hudson) and U.S senator Bob Torricelli (D-NJ).  Florio was endorsed by the State Party, Assemblyman Joe Doria (D-Hudson) and senator John Lynch (D-Middlesex).

Corzine defeated Florio in the primary and then defeated Bob Franks in the general election.

Franks, a moderate Republican, attacked Corzine for "trying to buy the election and of advocating big-government spending programs that the nation can ill afford." Corzine accused Franks of wanting to dismantle the Social Security system because he supported Governor George W. Bush's partial privatization plan.

During the campaign, Corzine refused to release his income tax return records. He claimed an interest in doing so, but he cited a confidentiality agreement with Goldman Sachs. Skeptics argued that he should have followed the example of his predecessor Robert Rubin, who converted his equity stake into debt upon leaving Goldman.

Corzine campaigned for state government programs including universal health care, universal gun registration, mandatory public preschool, and more taxpayer funding for college education.  He pushed affirmative action and same-sex marriage. David Brooks considered Corzine so liberal that although his predecessor was also a Democrat, his election helped shift the Senate to the left.

During Corzine's campaign for the United States Senate, he made some controversial off-color statements.  When introduced to a man with an Italian name who said he was in the construction business, Corzine quipped: "Oh, you make cement shoes!" according to Emanuel Alfano, chairman of the Italian-American One Voice Committee. Alfano also reported that when introduced to a lawyer named David Stein, Corzine said: "He's not Italian, is he? Oh, I guess he's your Jewish lawyer who is here to get the rest of you out of jail." Corzine denied mentioning religion, but did not deny the quip about Italians, claiming that some of his own ancestors were probably Italian, or maybe French.

Also in 2000, Corzine denied having paid off African-American ministers, when in fact the foundation controlled by him and his wife had paid one influential black church $25,000. Rev. Reginald T. Jackson, director of the Black Ministers Council, had campaigned against a form of racial profiling whereby police officers stop minority drivers and had gotten New Jersey state police superintendent, Carl A. Williams, fired. Corzine had donated to Jackson prior to getting what appears to be a reciprocal endorsement.

Franks generally trailed Corzine in the polls until the very last week, when he pulled even in a few polls. Corzine spent $63 million, while Franks spent only $6 million. Despite being heavily outspent, Franks lost by only three percentage points, doing better that year than Republican Governor George W. Bush in the presidential election, who obtained just 40% of the vote in the state.

New Mexico 

Incumbent Democrat Jeff Bingaman won re-election to a fourth term, beating Republican former Congressman Bill Redmond.

New York 

Hillary Rodham Clinton, then First Lady of the United States and the first First Lady to run for political office, defeated Congressman Rick Lazio. The general election coincided with the U.S. presidential election.

The race began in November 1998 when four-term incumbent Daniel Patrick Moynihan (D) announced his retirement. Both the Democratic Party and Republican Party sought high-profile candidates to compete for the open seat. By early 1999 Clinton and Mayor of New York City Rudolph Giuliani were the likely respective nominees. Clinton and her husband, President Bill Clinton, purchased a house in Chappaqua, New York, in September 1999; she thereby became eligible for the election, although she faced characterizations of carpetbagging since she had never resided in the state before. The lead in statewide polls swung from Clinton to Giuliani and back to Clinton as the campaigns featured both successful strategies and mistakes as well as dealing with current events. In late April and May 2000, Giuliani's medical, romantic, marital, and political lives all collided in a tumultuous four-week period, culminating in his withdrawing from the race on May 19.

The Republicans chose lesser-known Congressman Rick Lazio to replace him. The election included a record $90 million in campaign expenditures between Clinton, Lazio, and Giuliani and national visibility. Clinton showed strength in normally Republican upstate areas and a debate blunder by Lazio solidified Clinton's previously shaky support among women.

The contest drew considerable national attention and both candidates were well-funded. By the end of the race, Democrat Clinton and Republicans Lazio and Giuliani had spent a combined $90 million, the most of any U.S. Senate race in history.  Lazio outspent Clinton $40 million to $29 million, with Clinton also getting several million dollars in soft money from Democratic organizations.  Among Clinton antagonists circles, direct mail-based fundraising groups such as the Emergency Committee to Stop Hillary Rodham Clinton sprung up, sending out solicitations regarding the "carpetbagging" issue: just as one Clinton leaves office, another one runs.

Clinton secured a broad base of support, including endorsements from conservation groups and organized labor, but notably not the New York City police union which endorsed Lazio while firefighters supported Hillary.
While Clinton had a solid base of support in New York City, candidates and observers expected the race to be decided in upstate New York where 45 percent of the state's voters live. During the campaign, Clinton vowed to improve the economic picture in upstate New York, promising that her plan would deliver 200,000 New York jobs over six years. Her plan included specific tax credits with the purpose of rewarding job creation and encouraging business investment, especially in the high-tech sector. She called for targeted personal tax cuts for college tuition and long-term care.
Lazio faced a unique tactical problem campaigning upstate. The major issue there was the persistently weak local economy, which Lazio hoped to link to his opponent's husband's tenure in office. Attacks on the state of the upstate economy were frequently interpreted as criticism of incumbent Republican governor George Pataki, however, limiting the effect of this line of attack.

Opponents continued to make the carpetbagging issue a focal point throughout the race and during debates. Talk radio hammered on this, with New York-based Sean Hannity issuing a daily mantra, "Name me three things Hillary Clinton has ever done for the people of New York!"  Clinton's supporters pointed out that the state was receptive to national leaders, such as Robert F. Kennedy who was elected to the Senate in 1964 despite similar accusations. In the end, according to exit polls conducted in the race, a majority of the voters dismissed the carpetbagging issue as unimportant.

During the campaign, Independent Counsel Robert Ray filed his final reports regarding the long-running Whitewater, "Travelgate", and "Filegate" investigations of the White House, each of which included specific investigations of Hillary Clinton actions.  The reports exonerated her on the files matter, said there was insufficient evidence regarding her role in Whitewater, and said that she had made factually false statements regarding the Travel Office firings but there was insufficient evidence to prosecute her.  Although The New York Times editorialized that the release of the reports seemed possibly timed to coincide with the Senate election, in practice the findings were not seen as likely to sway many voters' opinions.

A September 13, 2000 debate between Lazio and Clinton proved important.  Lazio was on the warpath against soft money and the amounts of it coming from the Democratic National Committee into Clinton's campaign, and challenged Clinton to agree to ban soft money from both campaigns.  He left his podium and waved his proposed paper agreement in Clinton's face; many debate viewers thought he had invaded her personal space and as a result Clinton's support among women voters solidified.

Late in the campaign Lazio criticised Clinton for accepting campaign donations from various Arab groups in the wake of the  attack. This issue caused former New York Mayor Ed Koch to take out ads telling Lazio to "stop with the sleaze already," and did not change the dynamic of the race.

Per New York State law, Clinton and Lazio totals include their minor party line votes: Liberal Party of New York and Working Families Party for Clinton, Conservative Party for Lazio.

Clinton won the election on November 7 with 55 percent of the vote to Lazio's 43 percent, a difference larger than most observers had expected. Clinton won the traditionally Democratic base of New York City by large margins, and carried suburban Westchester County, but lost heavily populated Long Island, part of which Lazio represented in Congress. She won surprising victories in Upstate counties, such as Cayuga, Rensselaer, and Niagara, to which her win has been attributed.

In comparison with other results, this 12 percentage point margin was smaller than Gore's 25 point margin over Bush in the state Presidential contest, was slightly larger than the 10 point margin by which fellow New York senator Charles Schumer defeated incumbent Republican Al D'Amato in the hotly contested 1998 race, but was considerably smaller than the 47 point margin by which senator Schumer won re-election in 2004 against little-known Republican challenger Howard Mills. The victory of a Democrat in the Senate election was not assured, because in recent decades the Republicans had won about half the elections for governor and senator.

Lazio's bid was handicapped by the weak performance of George W. Bush in New York in the 2000 election, but it was also clear Hillary Clinton had made substantial inroads in upstate New York prior to Lazio's entry into the race. Exit polls also showed a large gender gap with Clinton running stronger than expected among moderate women and unaffiliated women.

North Dakota 

Incumbent Dem-NPL U.S. senator Kent Conrad won re-election to a third term, over Republican Naval Reserve officer Duane Sand.

Ohio 

Incumbent Republican Mike DeWine won re-election to a second term, beating Democrat Ted Celeste, real estate developer and brother of former Ohio Governor Dick Celeste.

Pennsylvania 

Incumbent Republican Rick Santorum won re-election to a second term over Democratic Congressman Ron Klink.

Santorum had gained a reputation as a polarizing figure during his first term in the Senate, but he entered the race with a large fundraising advantage and high levels of support from the political right. The contest began for Democrats with a brutal primary challenge; U.S. Congressman Klink narrowly bested State senator Allyson Schwartz and former Lieutenant Governor nominee Tom Foley by running on the message that he was the only candidate capable of defeating the Republican. Klink was viewed as a viable choice because he was a traditional Democrat on most issues and had strong union ties but also was pro-life, which Democrats hoped would return votes to their party in the heavily Catholic but economically liberal coal regions of the state. However, enthusiasm around Klink's campaign quickly waned. Liberal Democrats, particularly in the Philadelphia area, balked at donating to a socially conservative candidate who was almost unknown in their area. He was also badly outspent, leaving him unable to expand his presence in the state; he didn't run a single ad on Philadelphia television.  Santorum, in contrast, successfully balanced his national recognition on social issues with local concerns en route to a surprisingly large victory.

Rhode Island 

Incumbent Republican Lincoln Chafee was elected his first full term after being appointed in 1999 to fill the seat of his father, the previous Senator, John Chafee who died on October 24, 1999, a few months after the elder Chafee announced his retirement instead of seeking a fifth term. As of 2022, this is the last Senate election in Rhode Island won by a Republican.

Tennessee 

Incumbent Republican Bill Frist won re-election to a second term.

The Democratic primary was held August 3, 2000. In a field of five candidates, Jeff Clark, a professor at Middle Tennessee State University, edged out John Jay Hooker to win the nomination.

Texas 

Incumbent Republican Kay Bailey Hutchison won re-election to a second term, beating Democrat Gene Kelly, a retired attorney.

Utah 

Incumbent Republican Orrin Hatch won re-election to a fifth term, beating Democratic State senator Scott N. Howell.

Vermont 

Incumbent Republican Jim Jeffords won re-election to a third term in office, over Ed Flanagan, Vermont Auditor of Accounts. Jeffords switched from being a Republican to an independent, who would later caucus with the Democratic Party following the 2000 election in May 2001, thus breaking the 50-50 lock. As of 2022, this is the last Senate election in Vermont won by a Republican.

Virginia 

Incumbent Democrat Chuck Robb ran for a third term, but lost to Republican George Allen.

Washington 

Incumbent Republican Slade Gorton ran for a third consecutive term (fourth overall), but was unseated for a second time (the first being 1986) by Democratic candidate, former Congresswoman Maria Cantwell.

Since Maria Cantwell had only won by 1,953 votes, or a margin of 0.08 percent, an automatic recount was triggered. Cantwell won the recount on December 1 with a margin of 2,229 votes (0.09%) in one of the closest elections in Washington state history.

West Virginia 

Incumbent Democrat Robert Byrd won re-election to an eighth term. He won every county and congressional district in the state.

Wisconsin 

Incumbent Democrat Herb Kohl won re-election to a third term.

Wyoming 

Incumbent Republican Craig Thomas won re-election to a second term over Democratic mine worker Mel Logan.

See also
 2000 United States elections
 2000 United States gubernatorial elections
 2000 United States presidential election
 2000 United States House of Representatives elections
 106th United States Congress
 107th United States Congress

Notes

References

Further reading

External links 
 
 JoinCalifornia 2000 General Election
 United States Election 2000 Web Archive from the U.S. Library of Congress
 2000 North Dakota U.S. Senate Election results